"Blow Your Mind" is the debut single from New Zealand R&B singer J. Williams. It features on his debut album,  Young Love. It was released digitally on 11 August 2008. The single debuted on the RIANZ singles chart on 15 September 2008 at number 19. It later peaked at number 13.

References 

2008 singles
J. Williams (singer) songs
2008 songs
Warner Music Group singles
Songs written by J. Williams (singer)
Songs written by Inoke Finau